

De Mazenod College (DMC), founded in 1914, is a Catholic school in Kandana, Sri Lanka, managed by the De La Salle Brothers. De Mazenod College is a mixed school and has classes from grade 1 to grade 13. Classes are conducted in Sinhala as well as English. Girls are admitted to the school from grade 6 upwards.

History

St. Sebastian's English School was founded by A. Y. Keegerat at the Mission House of Kandana Church in 1914. In 1919, Romould Fernando took charge of the school, and a few years later, on 15 June 1925, helped the school gain recognition from the Government of Sri Lanka. From 1925 to 1927, the school became known as St. Sebastian's Boys' English School until being renamed St. Sebastian's English High School.

On 12 October 1930, Colombo Archbishop Pierre-Guillaume Marque laid the foundation for a new building at the school's current location. In 1931, it was renamed to De Mazenod College, and in 1933, it came under the control of the De La Salle brothers. The first prize giving was held in 1937 under the patronage of the principal, Charles Louis, and was attended by Deputy Education Director W. R. Watson.

The first ever inter-house sports meet was held in 1938. The chief guest was S. W. R. D. Bandaranaike. The college houses at the time were De La Salle, Marque, and Romould.

An old boys' union with about 100 members was inaugurated in 1943, and Sinhala-language classes began in 1947

Houses 
The students are divided into four houses:

Alban House
 Named after Alban Patrick, a former principal of the school.
 Color : Red

De La Salle House
 Named after Saint Jean-Baptiste de la Salle
 Color : Blue

Marque House
 Named after Colombo Archbishop Pierre-Guillaume Marque
 Color : Yellow

Romould House
 Named after the founder of school, Romould Fernando.
 Color : Green

Notable alumni 

Below is a list of notable alumni of De Mazenod College

Past principals 

 Romould Fernando (founder)
 Andrew Etienne
 Theodoret of Mary
 Charles Louis
 Alban Patrick
 Casimir
 Frederick Peter
 Cassian of Jesus
 Athanasius Navarre
 Glastone Oliver
 Hermangild Joseph
 Athanasius Navarre
 Anselm Calixtus
 Alexander Cyrillus
 Conrad Rodrigo
 Sylvester Pius
 Hugo Anthony
 Camillus Silva
 Benjamin Goonatilleke
 Granville Perera
 Camillus Silva
 Bertram Perera
 Janaka Fonseka (incumbent)

References

1914 establishments in Ceylon
Catholic secondary schools in Sri Lanka
Kandana
Private schools in Sri Lanka
Schools in Negombo